Jarrod King is a male badminton competitor for New Zealand. At the 1998 Commonwealth Games he won a bronze medal in the men's team event.

References

Living people
New Zealand male badminton players
Commonwealth Games bronze medallists for New Zealand
Badminton players at the 1998 Commonwealth Games
Commonwealth Games medallists in badminton
Year of birth missing (living people)
Medallists at the 1998 Commonwealth Games